Thomas Savig Kleppe (July 1, 1919 – March 2, 2007) was an American politician who served as the Representative from North Dakota. He was also the Administrator of the Small Business Administration and the U.S. Secretary of the Interior.

Early life and military service
Kleppe was born on July 1, 1919, in Kintyre, North Dakota, the son of Lars O. Kleppe and his wife Hannah Savig Kleppe. He graduated from Valley City High School in Valley City, North Dakota in 1936. Kleppe graduated from Valley City State University, (then Valley City Teachers College). During World War II, Kleppe served from 1942 to 1946 as a Warrant Officer.

Career
From 1950 to 1954, Kleppe was the Mayor of Bismarck, North Dakota. From 1946 to 1964, he was the president and treasurer of the Gold Seal Company. 
In 1964, Kleppe was the Republican nominee for United States Senate but lost to the popular incumbent Democrat Quentin N. Burdick. In 1966 he was elected to the Ninetieth United States Congress, and he was reelected in 1968 to the Ninety-first United States Congress (January 3, 1967 – January 3, 1971). Kleppe voted in favor of the Civil Rights Act of 1968.

With the state's second congressional district by then all but certain to be abolished following the 1970 census, Kleppe opted to seek a rematch against Burdick in 1970. He was once again unsuccessful, losing by a wide margin.

He served as the Administrator of the Small Business Administration, and later served as the Secretary of the Interior for President Gerald Ford. In his capacity as the Secretary of the Interior, Kleppe was the appellant in Kleppe v. New Mexico (1976), when the Supreme Court ruled that Congress has the "power to protect wildlife on the public lands, state law notwithstanding."

Personal life
His first wife, Frieda K. Kleppe, died in 1957. Kleppe married his second wife, Glendora Loew Gompf, on December 18, 1958. He had two children from his first marriage and two daughters from his second marriage. He resided in Bismarck, North Dakota. Kleppe died of Alzheimer's disease, in Bethesda, Maryland, on March 2, 2007.  He was buried in Arlington National Cemetery in Arlington, Virginia.

See also
North Dakota United States Senate election, 1970
North Dakota United States Senate election, 1964
 Sagebrush Rebellion
 Kleppe v. New Mexico

References

Further reading

 Daynes, Byron W.,  and Glen Sussman. White house politics and the environment: Franklin D. Roosevelt to George W. Bush (2010) pp 139–54.
 Fischman, Robert L., and Jeremiah I. Williamson. "The Story of Kleppe v. New Mexico: The Sagebrush Rebellion as Un-Cooperative Federalism." University of Colorado Law Review 83 (2011): 123+ online

External links
The Thomas S. Kleppe Papers (Chester Fritz Library. University of North Dakota)

|-

|-

1919 births
2007 deaths
20th-century American politicians
Administrators of the Small Business Administration
American Lutherans
United States Army personnel of World War II
American people of Norwegian descent
Burials at Arlington National Cemetery
Neurological disease deaths in Maryland
Deaths from Alzheimer's disease
Ford administration cabinet members
Mayors of Bismarck, North Dakota
People from Emmons County, North Dakota
Politicians from Bismarck, North Dakota
Republican Party members of the United States House of Representatives from North Dakota
United States Secretaries of the Interior
Valley City State University alumni
United States Army soldiers